Beskin is a surname.

People with the surname 

 Beth Beskin (born 1959), American politician
 Emmanuil Beskin (1877–1940), Russian theatre critic and historian
 Sivan Beskin (born 1976), Israeli poet, translator, and literary editor

Surnames
Russian-language surnames